The International Racquetball Federation's 17th Racquetball World Championships were held in Burlington, Ontario, Canada, from June 14 to 21, 2014. This was the second time Worlds were in Canada. Previously, they were in Montreal in 1992.

In women's singles, Mexican Paola Longoria was the defending champion, and she successfully defended her title by defeating Rhonda Rajsich of the USA in the final, 15-6, 15-8. Longoria didn't lose any games en route to the title, including a straight games win in the semi-finals against Maria Jose Vargas, who was playing for Argentina after previously competing for Bolivia.

Unlike Longoria, Rajsich was pushed to tie-breakers twice in the early rounds, as she needed three games to defeat both fellow American Aubrey Kirch (in the second round) and Colombian Cristina Amaya in the quarterfinals. Indeed, Amaya had match points on Rajsich in both games two and three, but couldn't convert them, as Rajsich won 12-15, 15-14, 11-10. But in the semi-final, Rajsich beat Samantha Salas of Mexico in two straight games, 15-11, 15-9.

Tournament format
The 2014 World Championships was the first competition with an initial round robin stage that was used to seed players for an elimination qualification round. Previously, players were seeded into an elimination round based on how their countries had done at previous World Championships, and then a second team competition was also played.

Round robin

Pool A

Pool B

Pool C

Pool D

Pool E

Pool F

Pool G

Pool H

Pool I

Elimination round

References

2014 Racquetball World Championships